is a 2010 Japanese film directed by Itsumichi Isomura.

Plot 

Izumi (played by Keiko Kitagawa) loses her boyfriend Junichi Masaki Okada in a fatal motorcycle accident. As a result of the shock, she suffers recurring nightmares, depression and post traumatic stress disorder, as well as losing her memory from the time of the accident. A lawyer named Makiko (Nene Otsuka) helps Izumi to remember the final time her boyfriend was alive.

Cast  
Keiko Kitagawa as Izumi Sonoda 
Masaki Okada as Junichi Kono 
Nene Otsuka as Makiko Kirino 
Kin Sugai as An old woman

References 

Japanese drama films
2010 films
Films directed by Itsumichi Isomura
Films scored by Toshiyuki Watanabe
Films set in Shimane Prefecture
2010 drama films
2010s Japanese films